Nathaniel Robert "Nat" Benchley is an American writer and actor who has performed on stage, television, and film.

Life and career
Benchley is the son of Marjorie (Bradford) and Nathaniel Goddard Benchley, an author. He is the grandson of humorist Robert Benchley, a founding member of the Algonquin Round Table. He is the brother of author Peter Benchley, who wrote Jaws.

Since 1996, Nat Benchley has been performing Benchley Despite Himself, which he describes as "a compilation of
Robert Benchley's best monologues, short films, radio rantings and pithy pieces as recalled, edited, and acted by his grandson, and combined with family reminiscences and friends' perspectives." He has performed it in Washington, D.C.; New York, New York; Boston, Massachusetts; and other locations. The Washington Post called it "an engaging work that breaks with the usual conventions of one-man plays. Rather than inhabit the character of Robert Benchley the entire evening, Nat Benchley blends his own observations with re-creations of the routines and sketches that made his grandfather famous. The effect is at once seductive and distancing, perhaps a bit like Robert Benchley, whose humor often obscured his unhappiness."

He has recorded two CDs of Robert Benchley's monologues, Benchley on Benchley, Volumes 1 & 2. He also does narration work for commercials and television documentaries for the National Geographic Channel and the Discovery Channel.

His films include Diner, Broadcast News, and Home for the Holidays. He also had a continuing character role as Det. Augustus Polk in HBO's The Wire.

In 1988, he created the title role of "Church Key Charlie Blue" in Jim Lehrer's play. That same year, he and co-star Bill Grimmette were both nominated for  Helen Hayes Awards (Washington, DC's, version of the Tonys) for their performances in Athol Fugard's "The Blood Knot."

In the 1990s Benchley revived two Peter Cook and Dudley Moore stage productions, Beyond the Fringe and Good Evening in the Washington, D.C., area. He also appeared in the 1996 video game The Sacred Mirror of Kofun.

From the early 1980s to the early 2000s, he was an officer of the Screen Actors Guild for the Washington/Baltimore branch. He served as vice-president, president and national board member.

According to his Web site, "Prior to disdaining regular work, he wrote and produced public relations for WETA, the Washington, D.C. public television station, worked on a White House national drug abuse prevention campaign and served in the Philippines and Viet Nam in the U.S. Naval Security Group during the unpopular Southeast Asian dust-up." In the early 1970s, he wrote and acted in an anti-shoplifting film for the Florida Attorney General's office titled "High Pockets at Full Noon." And in 1999 he wrote a film for the FBI National Academy explaining their unique, multi-national networking program.

In 2009, he and co-editor Kevin C. Fitzpatrick published "The Lost Algonquin Round Table", a collection of early writings by his grandfather and other members of the fabled New York literary gang.

In 2011, he recorded audio versions of four of his father's children's books for HarperCollins Publisher's "I Can Read" series.

He is a graduate of The Choate School and Stanford University.

References

External links 
 
 
 

American male film actors
American male stage actors
American male television actors
Year of birth missing (living people)
Living people
Choate Rosemary Hall alumni
Stanford University alumni
20th-century American male actors
21st-century American male actors